The fifteenth series of Geordie Shore, a British television programme based in Newcastle upon Tyne, was confirmed on 8 August 2017 when a teaser video was released. The series began on 29 August 2017, and concluded after nine episodes on 17 October 2017. This was the final series to include Scotty T and Marty McKenna after they were both axed from the show, as well as original cast member Gaz Beadle following his decision to quit. The series also featured the brief return of Elettra Lamborghini, when the cast jetted off to Rome. The series included further twists in Aaron and Marnie's turbulent relationship, a newly single Gaz getting cosy with Abbie, as well as Chloe and Nathan's friendship facing its biggest strain to date. It also features the group visiting Rome, and Aaron taking part in his debut MMA fight in Birmingham.

Cast
Gaz Beadle
Aaron Chalmers
Elettra Lamborghini
Chloe Ferry
Nathan Henry
Abbie Holborn
Sophie Kasaei
Marty McKenna
Marnie Simpson
Scotty T

Duration of cast 

 = Cast member is featured in this episode.
 = Cast member voluntarily leaves the house.
 = Cast member returns to the house.
 = Cast member leaves the series.
 = Cast member is removed from the series.
 = Cast member features in this episode, but is outside of the house.
 = Cast member does not feature in this episode.
 = Cast member is not officially a cast member in this episode.

Off screen exits
During the fourth episode, Anna announced that Marty and Scotty T had been removed from the house, and would not be returning for the remainder of the series. This led to the eventual departure of Marty and Scotty T from the show.

Episodes

Ratings

References

2017 British television seasons
Series 15